The year 2000 is the 12th year in the history of Shooto, a mixed martial arts promotion based in the Japan. In 2000 Shooto held 13 events beginning with, Shooto: R.E.A.D. 1.

Title fights

Events list

Shooto: R.E.A.D. 1

Shooto: R.E.A.D. 1 was an event held on January 14, 2000, at Korakuen Hall in Tokyo, Japan.

Results

Shooto: R.E.A.D. 2

Shooto: R.E.A.D. 2 was an event held on March 17, 2000, at Korakuen Hall in Tokyo, Japan.

Results

Shooto: R.E.A.D. 3

Shooto: R.E.A.D. 3 was an event held on April 2, 2000, at The Namihaya Dome in Kadoma, Osaka, Japan.

Results

Shooto: R.E.A.D. 4

Shooto: R.E.A.D. 4 was an event held on April 12, 2000, at Kitazawa Town Hall in Setagaya, Tokyo, Japan.

Results

Shooto: R.E.A.D. 5

Shooto: R.E.A.D. 5 was an event held on May 22, 2000, at Korakuen Hall in Tokyo, Japan.

Results

Shooto: R.E.A.D. 6

Shooto: R.E.A.D. 6 was an event held on July 16, 2000, at Korakuen Hall in Tokyo, Japan.

Results

Shooto: R.E.A.D. 7

Shooto: R.E.A.D. 7 was an event held on July 22, 2000, at Kitazawa Town Hall in Setagaya, Tokyo, Japan.

Results

Shooto: R.E.A.D. 8

Shooto: R.E.A.D. 8 was an event held on August 4, 2000, at The Osaka Prefectural Gymnasium in Osaka, Japan.

Results

Shooto: R.E.A.D. 9

Shooto: R.E.A.D. 9 was an event held on August 27, 2000, at The Yokohama Cultural Gymnasium in Yokohama, Kanagawa, Japan.

Results

Shooto: R.E.A.D. 10

Shooto: R.E.A.D. 10 was an event held on September 15, 2000, at Korakuen Hall in Tokyo, Japan.

Results

Shooto: R.E.A.D. 11

Shooto: R.E.A.D. 11 was an event held on October 9, 2000, at Kitazawa Town Hall in Setagaya, Tokyo, Japan.

Results

Shooto: R.E.A.D. 12

Shooto: R.E.A.D. 12 was an event held on November 12, 2000, at Korakuen Hall in Tokyo, Japan.

Results

Shooto: R.E.A.D. Final

Shooto: R.E.A.D. Final was an event held on December 17, 2000, at The Tokyo Bay NK Hall in Urayasu, Chiba, Japan.

Results

See also 
 Shooto
 List of Shooto champions
 List of Shooto Events

References

Shooto events
2000 in mixed martial arts